The Men's 77 kg event at the 2010 South American Games was held over March 28 at 14:00. Although there was a tie for first place, Yony Andica, from Colombia, won due to a lower bodyweight.

Medalists

Results

New Records

References
Final

77kg M